Two ships of the Royal Navy have been named HMS Chelmer:

  was a  launched in 1904 and sold for scrap in 1920
 HMS Chelmer was to be the name of  but the ship was renamed before launching
  was a  launched in 1943 and scrapped in 1957

Royal Navy ship names